This is a list of islands in the world ordered by their highest point; it lists islands with peaks by elevation. At the end of this article continental landmasses are also included for comparison.

Island countries and territories listed are those containing the highest point. 


List of  islands with highest point by elevation

Other notable island peaks 

Many of the following islands are selected for inclusion as the main island or having the highest peak in their island nation. The list includes some dependent or semi-dependent island overseas territories with their own ISO 3166-1 country code. The dependencies of Guernsey (Alderney, Sark, Herm) and St. Helena (Tristan da Cunha, Ascension Island) are listed as separate units.

Nevis (Saint Kitts-Nevis) is also listed separately. The islands of the former Netherlands Antilles (Aruba, Curaçao, Bonaire, Saint Martin, Sint Eustatius, Saba) have been split up in separate units.

The list also includes other notable islands, for example some islands that are the highest island mountain of its country or autonomous region.

Lake islands

Continental landmasses

Volcanic islands
This list contains 50 island highpoints of volcanic origin.

See also

List of elevation extremes by country
List of elevation extremes by region
List of islands (by country)
List of islands by area
List of islands by name
List of islands by population
Recursive islands and lakes

Notes

References

Sources
 peaklist.org - majority of information about mountain heights comes from here.
 worldatlas.com - this site contains the highest mountain of each country in the world.

 
Islands by highest point